José Luis González may refer to:

 José Luis González (runner) (born 1957), Spanish middle and long-distance runner
 Jose Luis Gonzalez (artist) (active since 1956), Mexican designer, painter, muralist and sculptor
 José Luis González (writer) (1926–1996), Puerto Rican writer
 José Luis González (rugby union) (born 1997), Argentine rugby union player
 José Luis González China (born 1966), Mexican football player and manager
 José Luis González Dávila (1942–1995), Mexican football player
 José Luis González (composer) (born 1937), Mexican composer
 José Luis González (volleyball) (born 1984), Argentine volleyball player
 Jesse González (born José Luis González Gudiño, 1995), Mexican-American association footballer

See also
 José González (disambiguation)